The 2020 season is Hougang United's 23rd consecutive season in the top flight of Singapore football and in the S.League. Along with the S.League, the club will also compete in the Singapore Cup.  They will also compete in the 2020 AFC Cup, a first in their history.

Squad

S.League Squad

U19 Squad

Tiong Bahru FC
(Chairman, Bill Ng is also the chairman for the club)

Coaching staff

Transfers

Pre-season transfers

In

Note 1: Syukri Bashir returned to the team after the loan and move to Tanjong Pagar United. 

Note 2: Amer Hakeem was released after returning from loan.

Out

Note 1: Amer Hakeem was released after returning from loan.  He moved to Geylang International in the mid-season transfer window.

Retained / Extension

Promoted

Trial

Mid-season transfer

In 

Note 1: Afiq Yunos returned to the team after the loan and move from Trat FC was cancelled due to Covid 19.

Out

Friendlies

Pre-Season Friendly

Tour of Malaysia

Team statistics

Appearances and goals

Competitions

Overview

Charity Shield

Singapore Premier League

Singapore Cup

AFC Cup

Group stage

See also 
 2014 Hougang United FC season
 2015 Hougang United FC season
 2016 Hougang United FC season
 2017 Hougang United FC season
 2018 Hougang United FC season
 2019 Hougang United FC season

Notes

References 

Hougang United FC
Hougang United FC seasons